is a Japanese singer, actress, dancer, model and a former member of the group AAA.

Filmography

Drama

Anime

Information series

Films

Magazines

Internet distribution

Events

PC software

Products

Music works

Books

Photo books

References

External links
 Official profile at AAA's official website 
 Chiaki Ito on Twitter

Japanese women pop singers
Japanese actresses
Japanese female dancers
Japanese female models
1987 births
Living people
People from Nagoya
People from Aichi Prefecture
Musicians from Aichi Prefecture
AAA (band) members
21st-century Japanese singers
21st-century Japanese women singers